Kokoriči is a village in the Municipality of Križevci in northeastern Slovenia. The municipality is part of the traditional region of Styria and is now included in the Mura Statistical Region.

A small Neo-Gothic chapel in the settlement was built in 1891.

References

External links
Kokoriči on Geopedia

Populated places in the Municipality of Križevci